Roman Yosypovych Hryhorchuk (born 22 March 1965) is a Ukrainian football manager who is the head coach of Chornomorets Odesa and a former player.

Playing career
He started playing with Lysonia Berezhany and then Temp Shepetivka. He established himself as a striker while playing for Prykarpattya Ivano-Frankivsk while in the Ukrainian First League where he consistently was among the top-scorers of the League. He spent some time in foreign clubs in Austria, Poland and Russia.

Coaching career
In his coaching career, he was a successful manager in Latvia with FK Ventspils winning the Latvian championship three times from 2006 to 2008 as well as the Latvian Cup in 2005 and 2007.

During the 2009–10 Ukrainian Premier League season, Hryhorchuk was hired by Metalurh Zaporizhzhia. He stayed in that position only until the end of the season, though.

On 16 November 2010, Hryhorchuk was appointed as the manager of Chornomorets Odesa. He brought the club back into the Ukrainian Premier League after his 1st season in charge.

On 4 March 2012 his team won 1–0 against FC Illichivets Mariupol and couple of weeks later defeated Vorskla Poltava.

A year later Chornomorets won another 1-0 match against Metallurg Donetsk which made it possible for it to appear at the Ukrainian Cup by May of the same year. On 23 August 2013 his team played against KF Skënderbeu Korçë.

Hryhorchuk was appointed manager of Azerbaijan Premier League side Gabala FK on 21 December 2014, on an 18-month contract. On 20 December 2015, Hryhorchuk extended his Gabala contract for another season, until the end of the 2016–2017 season.
Following defeat to Keşla in the 2017–18 Azerbaijan Cup Final, Hryhorchuk left Gabala after his contract was not extended.

On 1 June 2018, FC Astana announced Hryhorchuk as their new manager. On 13 January 2020, Hryhorchuk left Astana by mutual consent.

On 5 September 2020, he was hired by Belarusian club Shakhtyor Soligorsk.

Honours

As Player
Temp Shepetivka
 KFK competitions: 1990

Prykarpattya Ivano-Frankivsk
 Ukrainian First League: 1993–94

As Coach
Shakhtyor Soligorsk
 Belarusian Premier League: 2020

Astana
 Kazakhstan Premier League: 2018, 2019
 Kazakhstan Super Cup: 2018, 2019, 2020

Chornomorets Odesa
 Ukrainian First League: 2010–11 
 Ukrainian Cup runners-up: 2012–13
 Ukrainian Super Cup runners-up: 2013

Ventspils
 Virslīga: 2006, 2007, 2008
 Latvian Cup: 2005, 2007
 Livonia Cup: 2008

References

External links

1965 births
Living people
Soviet footballers
Ukrainian footballers
Association football forwards
Ukrainian expatriate footballers
Expatriate footballers in Poland
Expatriate footballers in Austria
Expatriate footballers in Latvia
FC Pokuttia Kolomyia players
FC Spartak Ivano-Frankivsk players
FC Temp Shepetivka players
FC Kryvbas Kryvyi Rih players
FC Saturn Ramenskoye players
Ukrainian expatriate sportspeople in Russia
Expatriate footballers in Russia
Dinaburg FC players
Ukrainian Premier League players
Ukrainian football managers
FK Ventspils managers
FC Metalurh Zaporizhzhia managers
FC Chornomorets Odesa managers
Gabala FC managers
Ukrainian Premier League managers
Ukrainian expatriate football managers
Ukrainian expatriate sportspeople in Austria
Ukrainian expatriate sportspeople in Poland
Expatriate football managers in Latvia
Expatriate football managers in Azerbaijan
Dinaburg FC managers
Ukrainian expatriate sportspeople in Latvia
Ukrainian expatriate sportspeople in Azerbaijan
FC Astana managers
Expatriate football managers in Kazakhstan
Ukrainian expatriate sportspeople in Kazakhstan
FC Shakhtyor Soligorsk managers
Expatriate football managers in Belarus
Ukrainian expatriate sportspeople in Belarus
Sportspeople from Ivano-Frankivsk Oblast